Charles Willing (May 18, 1710 – November 30, 1754) was a Philadelphia merchant, trader and politician; twice he served as Mayor of Philadelphia, from 1748 until 1749 and again in 1754.

Early life
Charles Willing was born in Bristol, England, on May 18, 1710, the son of Thomas Willing and Anne Harrison. He traveled to the American British colonies by ship and settled in Philadelphia in 1728 at the age of eighteen. His cousin Thomas Willing was selling land and laying out plans for a new community called Willingtown which later became Wilmington, Delaware. While living in Willingtown, Charles Willing became a very successful businessman and held political offices such as councilman and magistrate.

Philadelphia
Later in life Willing moved to Philadelphia and in 1743 was elected to the Common Council. Soon afterwards in the year 1745 Willing was appointed as Justice. Then in 1747 Willing was appointed as one of the Justices of the City Court. The following year in 1748 he was elected as the City Mayor. While serving as mayor Willing was subsequently appointed Justice in the years 1749, 1752 and 1754. Willing was a founder and trustee of the Academy and College of Philadelphia (now the University of Pennsylvania). Willing was elected to serve a second term as mayor and during this time contracted ships fever and died on November 30, 1754.

Legacy
His wife's grandfather, Edward Shippen, and his eldest son, Thomas Willing, also served as mayors of Philadelphia. Thomas was also a Delegate to the Continental Congress from Pennsylvania. His son James Willing was a representative of the American Continental Congress and led a military expedition during the American War of Independence known as the Willing Expedition.

Career
Robert Morris apprenticed at the firm of Willing & Co., and later became a partner with Thomas in the renamed firm of Willing Morris & Co.

Personal life
He married Anne Nancy Shippen (1710–1791) in 1731, daughter of Abigail Grosse (1677–1716) and Joseph Shippen (1678–1741), together they had eleven children, including:

 Thomas Willing (1731–1821), who married Anne McCall (1745–1781), daughter of Samuel McCall (1721–1762)
 James Willing (1750–1801)
 Mary Willing (1740–1814), who married William Byrd III (1728–1777).
 Elizabeth Willing (1742–1830), who married Samuel Powel (1738–1793), a mayor of Philadelphia.

Charles Willing died on November 30, 1754, in Philadelphia and is buried in Christ Church Burial Ground.

References

External links
Biography and portrait at University of Pennsylvania 

1710 births
1754 deaths
Mayors of Philadelphia
Colonial American merchants
British emigrants to the Thirteen Colonies
People of colonial Pennsylvania
Burials at Christ Church, Philadelphia
Businesspeople from Pennsylvania